The 1929–30 United States collegiate men's ice hockey season was the 36th season of collegiate ice hockey in the United States.

Regular season

Standings

References

1929–30 NCAA Standings

External links
College Hockey Historical Archives

1929–30 United States collegiate men's ice hockey season
College